Piano Variations is a set of variations for piano, possibly:

Copland Piano Variations
Variations for piano (Webern)
List_of_compositions_by_Ludwig_van_Beethoven#Piano_variations